Cincinnato or Cincinato is the Italian form of the Latin name Cincinnatus. It may refer to:

 People named Cincinnatus in Italian contexts, especially:
 Lucius Quinctius Cincinnatus, early Roman general and dictator, namesake of many places in Italy
 Cincinnato Baruzzi
 Cincinnato, a municipality of Anzio in Italy
 Romulo Cincinato

See also
 Cincinnatus (disambiguation)